The Virginia Wesleyan Marlins sports teams are known as the Marlins. The university plays in the Old Dominion Athletic Conference (ODAC) and is a member of the National Collegiate Athletic Association (NCAA) Division III.

Men's sports include baseball, basketball, cross country, golf, lacrosse, soccer, swimming, indoor/outdoor track and field, and tennis. Women's sports include basketball, cross country, field hockey, golf, lacrosse, soccer, softball, swimming, tennis, indoor/outdoor track and field, and volleyball.

The university maintains an Athletic Hall of Fame honoring those who have made lasting contributions to Virginia Wesleyan's intercollegiate athletic program through outstanding achievements or service.

The men's basketball team won the national championship in 2006, and the following year returned to the championship game, which they lost. The women's soccer team made it to the final four in 2006 after winning the ODAC tournament for the first time in program history. In 2016, Evan Cox was the Individual NCAA National Champion for Men's Golf. The Virginia Wesleyan College softball team won the 2017 NCAA Division III National Championship with a record 54 wins. Head Coach Brandon Elliott was named NCAA Division III National Coach of the Year. Freshman pitcher Hanna Hull was named first-team All-American and earned Outstanding Player in the NCAA National Tournament, NCAA Freshman of the Year, and NCAA Player of the Year. The following year, the Marlins softball team repeated at National Champions, defeating Illinois Wesleyan to claim their second Division III NCAA Nationals Championship. The team also broke their record of 54 wins set the previous year by earning a new national record by notching a total of 55 wins. Also repeating another award was Sophomore pitcher Hanna Hull, who claimed her second Player of the Year award.

Virginia Wesleyan University added a co-ed club Esports program that offers students the chance to participate in video game competitions at the collegiate level in fall 2019. VWU is a member of the National Association of Collegiate Esports (NACE) and will begin competing with local and national teams in January 2020. The Marlin Esports Arena in the Jane P. Batten Student Center is equipped with 17 high-end gaming PCs.

The Virginia Wesleyan Softball team returned to the national stage again in 2021, following a 2020 season that was abruptly ended by COVID-19, to win the NCAA Division III Softball National Championship, the programs third in four (complete) seasons.  Graduate student Hanna Hull and fifth-year senior Jessica Goldyn were named the 2021 Schutt Sports/NFCA Division III Pitcher and Player of the Year respectively after helping lead the team through the Regional and National Tournaments.

Varsity teams

List of teams

Men's sports
 Baseball
 Basketball
 Cross Country
 Golf
 Indoor Track & Field
 Lacrosse
 Outdoor Track & Field
 Soccer
 Swimming
 Tennis
 Volleyball (Coming 2023-24)

Women's sports
 Basketball
 Cross Country
 Field Hockey
 Golf
 Indoor Track & Field
 Lacrosse
 Outdoor Track & Field
 Soccer
 Softball
 Swimming
 Tennis
 Volleyball

Facilities

ODAC Championships

Men

Baseball: 1997, 1998, 2000, 2003, 2004, 2006

Men's Basketball: 1993, 2005, 2006, 2009, 2012, 2014

Men's Soccer: 1990, 1991, 1992, 1995, 1997, 1999, 2003, 2005, 2008, 2013

Women
Women's Basketball: 2015

Field Hockey: 2004

Women's Soccer: 2006, 2021

Softball: 1991, 1992, 1993, 1997, 1998, 2011, 2013, 2014, 2016, 2017, 2018, 2019, 2021, 2022

Volleyball: 2019

NCAA National Championships

Men's Basketball: 2006 

Men's Golf: 2016; Evan Cox (Individual) 

Softball: 2017, 2018, 2021

References

External links
 Official website of Virginia Wesleyan Marlins Athletics